Marymount Manhattan College is a private college on the Upper East Side of New York City. As of 2020, enrollment consists of 1,571 undergraduates with women making up 80.1% and men 19.9% of student enrollment. The college was founded in 1936.

History

Marymount Manhattan College was founded in 1936 by the Religious of the Sacred Heart of Mary as a two-year women's college and a New York City extension of Marymount College, Tarrytown in Tarrytown, New York. In 1948, the college moved to its present location on East 71st Street and became a four-year bachelor's degree-granting college; the first class graduated from MMC in 1950. In 1961, MMC was granted an absolute charter as an independent four-year college by the Regents of the University of the State of New York.

Since 1961, Marymount Manhattan has been an independent, private college open to all creeds, while noting its foundation by the Religious of the Sacred Heart of Mary.  While the college no longer described itself as Catholic, the Catholic Church continued to list it in the Catholic Directory until 2005.  Unaware that the college did not claim to be a Catholic school, the Cardinal Newman Society protested the college's announcement of its decision to invite then-Senator Hillary Clinton to deliver a commencement address and to confer an honorary doctoral degree upon her, due to Senator Clinton's longtime public support for abortion rights. In response to the protests and without objection by the college, it was de-listed from "The Official Catholic Directory," which identifies Catholic institutions.

In 1976, Finch College, a women's college best known as a "finishing school" for affluent young women, closed and passed its records over to the school. The school was most famous for educating Tricia Nixon Cox, daughter of former US President Richard Nixon.

In 1990, Regina Peruggi became the first lay president. In 2003, the college's mezzanine was renamed in her honor. Peruggi was married to Rudy Giuliani from 1968 to 1982. Their marriage ended due to the revelation that they were cousins.

In 2001, the college opened the 55th Street Residence Hall, one of the tallest dorms in the United States, with 32 floors of student housing in a 46-story building. In 2015, Marymount Manhattan opened a second residence hall for upperclassmen located in Cooper Square, a 12-story building to house 270 students

In 2017, just under 2,000 students were enrolled representing 48 U.S. states and 36 countries. In conjunction with its core liberal arts curriculum, Marymount Manhattan offers 30 major programs of study and over 40 minors along with pre-professional programs. It is accredited by the Middle States Association of Colleges and Secondary Schools. The college offers a degree program for incarcerated women at the Bedford Hills Correctional Facility, granting an Associates of Arts degree in social science and Bachelor of Arts degree in sociology.

In 2013, the school was featured in the noted industry publication Backstage as one of the top colleges in which Broadway and Tony Award-nominated actors have trained, alongside Carnegie Mellon University, Oberlin Conservatory, University of Michigan, Ithaca College, NYU's Tisch School of the Arts, and the University of North Carolina School of the Arts.

In July 2015, Kerry Walk was unanimously selected by the Trustees of Marymount Manhattan College as the school's eighth president.

Notable alumni

Alumni include prominent actors, musicians, attorneys, writers, journalists, royalty, the first female nominee for Vice President of the United States from a major party, and recipients of the Olympic Gold Medal, Tony Award, Emmy Award, and Grammy Award.

Emin Agalarov, Azerbaijani-Russian pop star, businessman, and son of Aras Agalarov
Annaleigh Ashford,  actress, singer, and dancer
Candace Bailey, actress and presenter
Maddie Baillio, actress and singer
Melissa Benoist, actress and singer 
Lana Cantrell, singer and entertainment lawyer
Marie Corridon, competition swimmer and Olympic champion
Laverne Cox, actress 
Alexandra Daddario, actress 
Desmond Devenish, filmmaker and actor
Geraldine Ferraro,  United States vice-presidential candidate (1984)
Joan Fitz-Gerald, former president of the Colorado Senate
Travis Flores, American activist, philanthropist, motivational speaker, actor and children's book author
Ita Ford,  Maryknoll Sister martyred in El Salvador in 1980
Marianne Githens, political scientist, feminist, and author
Spencer Grammer, actress
Katharine Sweeney Hayden, U.S. District Judge for the District of New Jersey
Mimi Imfurst, drag queen, actor, singer
Moira Kelly, actress
Mina Liccione, performing artist
Kelly-Anne Lyons, actress
Princess Marie of Denmark, wife of Prince Joachim of Denmark, second son of Margrethe II of Denmark
Sallie Manzanet-Daniels, Associate Justice of the Appellate Division of the Supreme Court, First Judicial Department
Cindy Meehl, documentary filmmaker
Bunny Michael, visual artist, musician, and rapper
Erik Palladino, actor
Manny Pérez, film and theatre actor
Andrew Rannells, actor and singer
Melissa Rauch, comedian, writer, and actress
Emmy Raver-Lampman, actor
Regina Richards, singer
Rose Ann Scamardella, former television news anchor
Paige Spara, actress
Tika Sumpter, actress
Jenna Ushkowitz, actress
Adrienne Warren, actress and singer

References

External links
Official website

 
1936 establishments in New York City
Educational institutions established in 1936
Former women's universities and colleges in the United States
Former Catholic universities and colleges in the United States
Universities and colleges in Manhattan
Universities and colleges in New York City
Private universities and colleges in New York City